Parliamentary elections were held in South Vietnam on 30 August 1959, resulting in an overwhelming victory for President Ngô Đình Diệm and the government. The regime won all but two of the 123 seats in the National Assembly, taken by five pro-government political parties and pro-government independent candidates. The elections allowed some liberalization in terms of freedom of speech, but the Diệm regime continued to maintain rigid control over the election process. Despite considerable efforts in preventing a small number of opposition candidates from standing during the election through the use of army soldiers bussed in to stuff ballot boxes to support the pro-government candidates, two independent candidates from the opposition were elected – Phan Quang Đán and Phan Khắc Sửu. However, during the first inaugural session of the National Assembly, Đán and another independent deputy, Nguyen Tran were not permitted to attend and were arrested and charged with electoral fraud. The election as a whole was described by a 1966 CIA report as the "dirtiest and most openly rigged" of all South Vietnamese elections.

Background
North Vietnam suggested to Diệm that the pre-electoral consultative conference should be held. This was done in May and June 1956, in July 1957, in May 1958 and again in July 1959. The offer was to be negotiated between North and South Vietnam, on the basis of "free general elections by secret ballot." All such offers were rejected. Diệm refused to have the election called for in Article 7 of the Declaration of the Geneva Agreements, as the former State of Vietnam had not signed to the Geneva Agreements – therefore it did not abide to any of its agreements. The United States supported him fully. The result of such refusal was the disastrous civil war which ensued. American Senator Ernest Gruening, in a speech delivered to the United States Senate on 9 April 1965 said "That civil war began... when Diệm's regime—at our urging—refused to carry out the provision contained in the Geneva Agreement to hold elections for the reunification of Vietnam."

Results

Aftermath
Dan was regarded as a nationalist anti-communist who was one of the most able political figures in the country, and was elected by a 6-1 ratio over Diem's government candidate. This came despite 8,000 Army of the Republic of Vietnam soldiers being bussed from out of district to stuff ballot boxes.

Despite strong protests from the US and UK embassies, Diệm was adamant that Đán would not be able to take his seat. When the Assembly was inaugurated, Đán was confronted by police and put under arrest as he attempted to leave his medical clinic to attend the session. Đán was charged with electoral fraud, on the grounds that he supposedly offered free medical care to induce voters to support him. He also pointed out that if this were the case, then he would have run for election in the district in which his practice was located, to maximise the number of patients who were in his voting district.

References

South Vietnam
Parliamentary election
1959
Electoral fraud in Vietnam
Election and referendum articles with incomplete results